Newer Wave is a various artists compilation album released on February 28, 1997 by 21st Circuitry.

Reception

Aiding & Abetting gave Newer Wave a mixed review, calling the material "a bit silly" but "a good idea, and the bands here try real hard to create new versions of well-worn tunes." Tom Schulte of AllMusic described the compilation as "fun and a real history lesson to listen to." Sonic Boom said "regardless of whether you thought the eighties was a collection of music filled with unimaginative drivel or was the groundwork of the modern electronic dance scene you'll get a kick out of this compilation" and "definitely of those compilations bound to give you fits of nostalgia for years to come."

Track listing

Personnel
Adapted from the Newer Wave liner notes.

 Case – featuring (1)
 Matt – cover art, design

Release history

References

External links 
 Newer Wave at Discogs (list of releases)

1997 compilation albums
Electronic body music compilation albums
Industrial rock compilation albums
21st Circuitry compilation albums